Gertrūda Benze (22 April 1933 – 10 February 2021) was a German-born Lithuanian doctor and linguist.

Biography
Following World War II, Benze found herself in the Lithuanian Soviet Socialist Republic due to the redrawing of borders. She learned the Lithuanian language and graduated from the Martin Luther University of Halle-Wittenberg in 1961, becoming a certified doctor. She then taught linguistics at her alma mater until 1993, carrying out vast amounts of research on the ethnographic region of Lithuania Minor and the texts of Protestant Lithuanian hymns. She also published a textbook on the Lithuanian language.

Gertrūda Benze died on 10 February 2021 at the age of 87.

References

1933 births
2021 deaths
Women linguists
Linguists from Lithuania
Lithuanian academics
20th-century Lithuanian women
21st-century Lithuanian women
People from East Prussia
Academic staff of the Martin Luther University of Halle-Wittenberg